This is a list of ports of entry in Nepal.

Airports
Tribhuvan International Airport

Land border crossings

India border
(from east to west)

China border

The following a some trails connecting the two country:

See also
Border checkpoint
Port of entry

References

Ports
Ports of Nepal
Nepal
ports of entry